The 1985 IBF World Championships (World Badminton Championships) were held in Calgary, Canada, from June 10 to June 16, 1985. Following the results of the men's singles. Men's top seed Zhao Jianhua of China withdrew from the tournament after suffering from pneumonia.

Main stage

Section 1

Section 2

Section 3

Section 4

Finals

References

1985 IBF World Championships